Trixoscelis is a genus of flies in the family Heleomyzidae. For the most part they are small to minute flies found in warm semi-arid conditions on sand dunes, dry grasslands or shrubby places. They are widely distributed in the Palaearctic.

Species
These 94 species belong to the genus Trixoscelis:

T. adnubila Cogan, 1977 c g
T. albinervis (Roser, 1840) c g
T. approximata (Loew, 1865) c g 
T. auroflava Soós, 1977 c g
T. baliogastra (Czerny, 1909) g
T. beckeri Soós, 1977 c g
T. bistriata Soós, 1977 c g
T. brandbergensis Woźnica, 2000 c g
T. brincki Cogan, 1971 c g
T. buccata Melander, 1952 i c g
T. canescens (Loew, 1865) c g
T. cinerea (Coquillett, 1902) i c g
T. claripennis (Malloch, 1913) i c g
T. coei (Bequaert, 1960) c g
T. coetzeci Cogan, 1977 c g
T. cogani Woźnica, 2000 c g
T. costalis (Coquillett, 1901) c g
T. crassitarsa Soós, 1977 c g
T. curvata Carles-Tolra, 1993 c g
T. deemingi Woźnica, 2009 c g
T. deserta (Melander, 1952) i c g b
T. deserticola Cogan, 1977 c g
T. discolor Soós, 1977 c g
T. dumbii Cogan, 1977 c g
T. flagellata Carles-Tolra & Ventura, 2001 c g
T. flavens (Melander, 1952) i c g
T. flavida (Melander, 1952) i c g b
T. flavipalpis Cogan, 1971 c g
T. franzi Soós, 1979 c g
T. frontalis (Fallén, 1823) i c g 
T. fucipennis Cogan, 1971 i c g
T. fumipennis (Melander, 1913) c g
T. gentilis (Frey, 1936) c g
T. gigans Carles-Tolra, 2001 c g
T. hessei Cogan, 1971 c g
T. incognita Woźnica, 2000 c g
T. intermedia Cogan, 1971 c g
T. irrorata Cogan, 1977 c g
T. jonesi Cogan, 1977 c g
T. jugoslaviensis (Bequaert, 1960) c g
T. laeta (Becker, 1907) c g
T. lindneri Cogan, 1977 c g
T. litorea (Aldrich, 1908) i c g
T. lyneborgi Hackman, 1970 c g 
T. marginella (Fallén, 1823) c g
T. margo Papp, 2005 c g
T. melanderi (Vockeroth, 1965) i c g
T. mendezabali Hackman, 1970 c g 
T. migueli Woźnica, 2009 c g
T. millennica Woźnica, 2000 c g
T. mixta Soós, 1977 c g
T. mohavea (Melander, 1952) i c g
T. mongolica Soós, 1977 c g
T. namibensis Cogan, 1977 c g
T. nigra Cogan, 1971 c g
T. nigrifemorata (Bezzi, 1908) c g
T. nigritarsa Soós, 1977 c g
T. nitidiventris (Melander, 1952) i c g
T. nubila Cogan, 1971 c g
T. nuda (Coquillett, 1910) c g
T. obscurella (Fallén, 1823) c g 
T. ornata (Johnson, 1895) c g
T. pallida Cogan, 1971 c g
T. paraproxima Soós, 1979 c g
T. pedestris (Loew, 1865) c g
T. peregrina Cogan, 1971 c g
T. phylacis Séguy, 1953 c g
T. plebs (Melander, 1952) i c g
T. polita (Malloch, 1931) b
T. problematica Cogan, 1971 c g
T. proxima (Séguy, 1936) c g
T. psammophila Hackman, 1970 c g
T. puncticornis (Becker, 1907) c g
T. punctifera (Bezzi, 1908) c g
T. pygochroa (Melander, 1952) i c g
T. sabinaevae Carles-Tolra, 1993 c g
T. sabulicola (Frey, 1958) c g
T. sagulata (Melander, 1952) i c g
T. sanctiferdinandi (Czerny, 1909) c g
T. serpens Carles-Tolra, 2001 c g
T. sexlineata Frey, 1949 c g
T. signifera (Melander, 1952) i c g b 
T. similis Hackman, 1970 c g 
T. stuckenbergi Cogan, 1971 c g
T. stukei Woźnica, 2009 c g
T. subobscura Cogan, 1971 c g
T. suffusa (Melander, 1952) i c g
T. triplex (Melander, 1952) i c g
T. tumida (Melander, 1952) i c g
T. uniformis Cogan, 1971 c g
T. vanharteni Woźnica, 2009 c g
T. vikhrevi Woźnica, 2007 c g 
T. yugoslavensis (Bequaert, 1960) g

Data sources: i = ITIS, c = Catalogue of Life, g = GBIF, b = Bugguide.net

References

Heleomyzidae
Diptera of Europe
Taxa named by Camillo Rondani